Colonel Crawford Local School District is a public school district serving students in Crawford County, Ohio located in and around North Robinson, Ohio. The school district enrolls 987 students as of the 2008–2009 academic year.  The district is named for Colonel William Crawford.

Schools

Elementary schools
Hannah Crawford Elementary School
Principal: Mrs. Jennifer Sautter (PreK through 5)

Middle schools
William Crawford Intermediate School
Principal: Mrs. April Bond (6 through 8)

High schools
Colonel Crawford High School
Principal: Mr. Jacob Bruner (9 through 12)

References

External links
Colonel Crawford Local School District official website

Education in Crawford County, Ohio
School districts in Ohio